Pat Shovelin (1975/6 – 21 October 2017) was a Gaelic football coach from Ardara, County Donegal. He was the goalkeeping coach for the Donegal county football team. He represented Ardara, his local club. Donegal won the 2012 All-Ireland Senior Football Championship Final and are All-Ireland Champions, the highest achievement in the sport of Gaelic football.

As Donegal goalkeeping coach, Shovelin was responsible for the training of county netminders Paul Durcan and Michael Boyle. Shovelin considered Durcan to be as influential as Peter Schmeichel.

Shovelin graduated through the ranks with manager Jim McGuinness, with the pair previously working together with the Donegal under-21 football team. His style was that of "always-smiling and ever-mischievous".

Shovelin was with Donegal when they won the NFL Division 2 title at Croke Park.  He was awarded medals on the basis of Donegal successes at senior and U21 levels.

Though diagnosed with liver cancer, he continued as part of the Donegal under-21 team that won an Ulster title in April 2017 and died that October.

Personal life
He was married. His first child was born on the Wednesday before Donegal won the 2012 All-Ireland Senior Football Championship Final. He and Shay Given were close.

References

1970s births
Date of birth missing
Place of birth missing
2017 deaths
Deaths from cancer in the Republic of Ireland
Deaths from liver cancer
Gaelic football goalkeeping coaches
Gaelic football selectors
People from Ardara, County Donegal